The huff and puff apparatus is used in school biology labs to demonstrate that carbon dioxide is a product of respiration.  A pupil breathes in and out of the middle tube. The glass tubing is arranged in such a way that one flask bubbles as the pupils breathes in, the other as the pupil breathes out. A suitable carbon dioxide indicator, such as limewater or bicarbonate indicator shows the increased presence of carbon dioxide in the outgoing breath. This turns the bicarbonate into milky white substance.

See also
 Respiration (physiology)

Science education